The varzea schiffornis (Schiffornis major), also called várzea mourner or greater schiffornis, is a species of bird in the family Tityridae. It has traditionally been placed in the manakin family, but evidence strongly suggest it is better placed in Tityridae, where now placed by SACC.

It is found in most western regions of the Amazon Basin, and Amazonian Bolivia, Brazil, Colombia, Ecuador, Peru; also regions of Venezuela. It mainly occurs in várzea.

References

External links
Greater schiffornis photo gallery VIREO Photo-High Res

varzea schiffornis
Birds of the Amazon Basin
varzea schiffornis
Taxonomy articles created by Polbot